Safonov and Safonova (feminine) is a Russian surname. Notable people with the surname include:

Andrey Safonov (b. 1964), politician from Transnistria
Boris Safonov (1915–1942), World War II flying ace
Dmitry Safonov (1895–1941), Soviet general
Igor Safonov, Soviet sprint canoer
Matvei Safonov (b. 1999), Russian footballer
Mikhail Safonov (pilot) (1893–1924), World War I flying ace
Oleg Safonov (b. 1960), Russian politician
Oleksandr Safonov (b. 1991), Ukrainian football player
Vasily Ilyich Safonov (1852–1918), Russian pianist, teacher, conductor and composer
Yevgeni Safonov (disambiguation), several people
Darya Safonova (b. 1981), Russian sprinter
Elena Safonova (b. 1956), Soviet and Russian film actress
Anna Safonova (1883–1975), maiden name of Anna Timiryova, daughter of Vasily Ilyich Safonov

See also 
Safonovo

Russian-language surnames